Naco, NACO, or NACo may refer to:

Organizations 
 National AIDS Control Organisation, a Government of India "Apex Body" for managing the AIDS epidemic in India by Ministry of Health and Family  Welfare.
 National Angel Capital Organization, a Canadian association of angel capital groups
 National Association of Counties, a non-profit liaison between county and federal government
 National Arts Centre Orchestra, an orchestra in Ottawa, Canada

Places 
 Naco, Arizona, a small town in south eastern Arizona
 Naco, Sonora, a small town in Mexico
 Naco, Honduras, a small town in Honduras

Other 
 Netherlands Airport Consultants (NACO), a Dutch airport consultancy firm
 Naco (slang), a pejorative slang term in Mexican Spanish
 "Naco", a person from Nacozari de García, Sonora, Mexico
 "Naco", a fictional product from Kim Possible, a portmanteau of nacho and taco invented by Ron Stoppable
 National Association of Co-operative Officials, a British trade union
 National Commodore of the United States Coast Guard Auxiliary
 NAOS-CONICA, an adaptive optics facility used for Very Large Telescope (VLT)